Plectroglyphidodon is a genus of fish in the family Pomacentridae.

Species
Plectroglyphidodon dickii (Liénard, 1839) 
 
Plectroglyphidodon flaviventris Allen and Randall, 1974    
Plectroglyphidodon imparipennis (Vaillant and Sauvage, 1875)
 
Plectroglyphidodon johnstonianus Fowler and Ball, 1924    
 
Plectroglyphidodon lacrymatus (Quoy and Gaimard, 1825) 
 
Plectroglyphidodon leucozonus (Bleeker, 1859) 
 
Plectroglyphidodon phoenixensis (Schultz, 1943) 
Plectroglyphidodon randalli Allen, 1991    
Plectroglyphidodon sagmarius Randall and Earle, 1999    
Plectroglyphidodon sindonis (D.S. Jordan and Evermann, 1903)

References

 
Pomacentrinae
Marine fish genera
Taxa named by Henry Weed Fowler